Morgan Draw is railroad moveable bridge over the Cheesequake Creek between the Morgan section of Sayreville and Laurence Harbor in Old Bridge in Middlesex County, New Jersey, United States. Located at MP 0.2 near the mouth on the Raritan Bay, the bascule bridge lies just upstream of the New Jersey Route 35 crossing. It is owned and operated by New Jersey Transit Rail Operations (NJT) and substantially rehabilitated in 2005-2008. A storm surge during Hurricane Sandy in 2012 caused severe damage to the bridge.

Operations
The Cheesequake Creek is used for recreational boating. The bridge serves the North Jersey Coast Line between the South Amboy and Aberdeen-Matawan stations. It is also used by Conrail. As of 2008 the Code of Federal Regulations stipulated that it open on signal; except that, at least four hours notice is required from January 1 through March 31 from 6 p.m. to 6 a.m.; from April 1 through April 30 and November 1 through November 30 (from 10 p.m. to 6 a.m. Monday through Thursday, and midnight Sunday through 6 a.m. Monday; and rom December 1 through December 31 from 10 p.m. to 6 a.m.

See also
NJT movable bridges
Laurence Harbor (NJT station)
List of crossings of the Raritan River

References

External links 
 Maritime Morgan
  Cheesequake Creek Marina
 Cheesequake Creek Railroad Bridge

Railroad bridges in New Jersey
NJ Transit bridges
Sayreville, New Jersey
Old Bridge Township, New Jersey
Bascule bridges in the United States
Bridges in Middlesex County, New Jersey
Transportation in Middlesex County, New Jersey
Bridges completed in 1912
Central Railroad of New Jersey
Pennsylvania Railroad bridges
1912 establishments in New Jersey